Carimar Beach Club is a boutique condo-style hotel located beachfront on Mead's Bay Beach, Anguilla. Carimar Beach Club has 24 villas and is built in the Mediterranean/Spanish style. The hotel has Wifi, a small gym, laundry facilities, snorkeling equipment, bikes, 2 tennis courts, and a concierge service.

The Anguillan authority, Anguilla-Beaches, named Carimar Beach Club as the best value hotel in Anguilla.  The Club is also listed as second best Small Hotel in the Caribbean, and having the third best service of All Caribbean Hotels by Tripadvisor readers.

See also
 List of hotels in the Caribbean

References

External links
 

Hotels in Anguilla
Hotel buildings completed in 1985
Hotels established in 1985